The Rough Guide to Irish Music is a world music compilation album originally released in 1996. The fourth release of the World Music Network Rough Guides series, the album covers both the Republic and The North, with an overall focus on tradition and revival. The compilation was produced by Phil Stanton, co-founder of the World Music Network.

Track listing

References 

1996 compilation albums
World Music Network Rough Guide albums